Conospermum capitatum is a shrub endemic to Western Australia.

It blooms between August and December producing cream-yellow and brown-red flowers.

It is found on hill slopes and winter-wet flat areas in the Wheatbelt, Peel, South West and Great Southern regions of Western Australia where it grows in sandy, loamy and clay soils often over laterite.

There are two subspecies:
 Conospermum capitatum subsp. glabratum
 Conospermum capitatum subsp. velutinum

References

External links

Eudicots of Western Australia
capitatum
Endemic flora of Western Australia
Plants described in 1810
Taxa named by Robert Brown (botanist, born 1773)